Prethopalpus marionae is a litter-dwelling goblin spider in the family Oonopidae.

Distribution
This species in north-eastern Queensland and south-eastern Papua New Guinea.

Description
The male is 1.09 mm, and the females 1.22 mm long.

Etymology
This species is named in honour of Marion Morgan.

References

Oonopidae
Spiders of Australia
Spiders described in 2012